In a city or town, the old town is its historic or original core. Although the city is usually larger in its present form, many cities have redesignated this part of the city to commemorate its origins after thorough renovations. There are many places throughout the world referred to as the old town (and this is sometimes construed as a proper noun and capitalized). This is a list of some famous old towns:

Africa

Algeria
 Casbah of Algiers, in Algeria

Egypt
 Medieval Cairo, in Cairo
 Old Rashid
 Saint Catherine's Monastery, in Sinai

Kenya 
 Mombasa Old Town

Morocco
 Old Meknes in Morocco
 old Essaouira, in Morocco
 Old Fes, in Morocco
 old Marrakech, in Morocco
 Tétouan in Morocco
 El Jadida in Morocco

Niger 
 Historic Center of Agadez

Tanzania/Zanzibar
 Stone Town in Zanzibar City (World Heritage site)

Tunisia
 Old Kairouan, in Tunisia
 Medina of Sousse in Tunisia
 Medina of Tunis in Tunisia

Asia and the Pacific

Bangladesh 
 Old Town in Dhaka, Old Dhaka

China
 Forbidden City and Old Town remnants of Beijing
 Mountain Resort temple town in Chengde
 Old Town of Dengfeng
 Old Town of Kaiping
 Old Town of Lijiang
 Old Town and Potala Palace of Lhasa
 Historic Centre of Macau
 Walled old town area of Nanjing
 Old Town of Pingyao
 Old Town of Qufu
 Old Town of Suzhou
 Historical centers of Xidi and Hongcun
 Old Town of Yinxu
 Old Town of Zhouzhuang

Fiji
 Historical Port Town of Levuka

India
 Old Town and monuments of Agra
 Historical center of Alchi
 Historical center of Amritsar
 Old Delhi
 Old Goa
 Historical center of Hyderabad
 Historical ruined center of Mandu
 Historical center of Mumbai
 Old Town and palace of Udaipur

Indonesia
Old Town of Jakarta, within and 4 Outlying Islands (Onrust, Kelor, Cipir dan Bidadari)
 Depok Lama (Old Town of Depok)
 Old Town of Semarang
 Historic City of Surabaya
 Historic Town of Bandung
 Historic Town of Medan 
 Historic Monuments of City of Ternate
 Historic Monuments of Banda Neira
 Historic Monuments of City Of Tidore
 Historic Center of City of Yogyakarta
 Old Mining Town Of Sawahlunto
 Old Town of Padang
 Old City of Bukittinggi
 Historic District of Lasem
 Historic Center of Solo (Surakarta) 
 Historic Town of Cirebon 
Ancient City of Banten
 Historic Center of Palembang
 Historic City of Tegal
 Historic Town of Bogor

Japan
 Historic remnants of old Kyoto
 Historic remnants of old Nara
 Historic remnants of old Nikkō
 Historic centers of Shirakawa-gō and Gokayama

Malaysia 
 Core heritage zone in George Town, a World Heritage Site
 Old Town in Ipoh
 Old Town in Petaling Jaya

Pakistan 
 Walled City of Lahore

Philippines

Philippines as the former colony of Spain has numerous heritage structures, most notably in:
 Old Town remnants of Intramuros in Manila
 Old Town of Vigan
 Old Town of Malolos
 Old Town of San Fernando
 Old Town of Pila
 Old Town of Taal
 Old Town of Balayan
 Old Town of Baclayon
 Old Town of Iloilo
 Old Town of Laoag
 Old Town of Loboc
 Old Town of Carcar
 Old Town of Silay
 Old Town of Baclayon
 Old Town of Dapitan

South Korea

 Bukchon Hanok Village (Seoul)
 Insa-dong (Seoul)
 Nampo-dong (Busan)
 Hahoe Folk Village (Andong)
 Yangdong Folk Village (Gyeongju)

Syria
Ancient City of Damascus
Ancient City of Aleppo

Thailand

Rattanakosin Island of Bangkok
Talat Noi and Song Wat Road of Bangkok
Kudi Chin of Bangkok
Ban Sing Tha of Yasothon
Old Phuket Town of Phuket
Chak Ngaeo of Chonburi
Chanthaboon Riverside Community of Chanthaburi
Chiang Khan of Loei
Chum Saeng of Nakhon Sawan
 Tha Chalom of Samut Sakhon

Uzbekistan
 Tashkent
 Samarkand
 Bukhara
 Khiva

Vietnam
 Old Town of Hanoi
 Old Town of Hội An
 Old Town of Huế

Europe

Austria 

UNESCO World Heritage old towns in Austria:
Graz (Styria)
Krems an der Donau (Lower Austria)
Salzburg (Salzburg), Altstadt Salzburg
Innere Stadt (Vienna)

Other notable/famous old towns include:
Hall in Tirol (Tyrol)
Innsbruck (Tyrol)
Linz (Upper Austria)
Steyr (Upper Austria)
Klagenfurt am Wörthersee (Carinthia)

Belgium
Antwerp
Arlon
Binche
Bruges
Brussels
Dendermonde
Dinant
Durbuy
Ghent
Leuven
Liège
Lier
Mechelen
Mons
Namur
Thuin
Tournai
Ypres

Bosnia and Herzegovina
 Historic Center of Sarajevo
 Stari Most (Old City of Mostar)
 City of Višegrad

Bulgaria 
Old Town in Plovdiv
Old Town in Lovech
Old Town in Nessebur

Croatia
Old Town of Dubrovnik, UNESCO World Heritage Site
Old Town of Split with Diocletian's Palace, UNESCO World Heritage Site
Old Town of Trogir, UNESCO World Heritage Site
Old Town of Varaždin
Gradec and Kaptol, twin old towns of Zagreb

Czech Republic 
 Staré Město in Prague, UNESCO World Heritage Site
 Vnitřní město in Český Krumlov, UNESCO World Heritage Site
 Vnitřní město in Kutná Hora, UNESCO World Heritage Site
 Vnitřní město in Telč, UNESCO World Heritage Site

Cyprus 
Walled city of Nicosia
Walled city of Famagusta
Old town of Limassol
Old town of Paphos also traditionally known as Ktima. Not to be confused with Nea Paphos a World Heritage Site
Old town of Larnaca

Denmark 
 Den Gamle By in Aarhus

Estonia 
 Old Town (Vanalinn) of Narva
 Old Town (Vanalinn) of Tallinn, UNESCO World Heritage Site
 Old Town (Vanalinn) of Tartu

Finland 
 Old Town (Vanhakaupunki) of Porvoo
 Vanhakaupunki in Helsinki
Old Rauma

France 

The equivalent of "Old Town" in French is vieille ville, although the more formal centre historique ("historical center") is usually written on road signs.

UNESCO World Heritage old towns in France:
Albi (Tarn)
Avignon (Vaucluse)
Bordeaux (Gironde)
Carcassonne (Aude)
Lyon (Rhône)
Provins (Seine-et-Marne)
Strasbourg (Bas-Rhin)

Other notable/famous old towns include:
Auxerre (Yonne)
Besançon (Doubs)
Lille (Nord)
Montpellier (Hérault)
Nice (Alpes-Maritimes)
Paris (Ile de France)
Rennes (Ille-et-Vilaine)
Rouen (Seine-Maritime)
Saint-Malo (Ille-et-Vilaine)
Toulouse (Haute-Garonne)

Georgia 
 Old Tbilisi (Dzveli Tbilisi) in Tbilisi
 Historical Center in Mtskheta, UNESCO World Heritage Site
 Old Town in Kutaisi
 Old Town in Batumi

Germany 

 UNESCO World Heritage old towns in Germany:
Bamberg (Franconia)
Goslar (Lower Saxony)
Lübeck (Schleswig-Holstein)
Quedlinburg (Saxony-Anhalt)
Regensburg (Bavaria)
Stralsund (Western Pomerania)
Wismar (Mecklenburg)

Other notable/famous old towns include:
Northern Germany:
Bad Doberan (Mecklenburg)
Binz (Western Pomerania)
Celle (Lower Saxony)
Eckernförde (Schleswig)
Flensburg (Schleswig)
Friedrichstadt (Schleswig)
Güstrow (Mecklenburg)
Hamelin (Lower Saxony)
Hann. Münden (Lower Saxony)
Heringsdorf (Western Pomerania)
Lüneburg (Lower Saxony)
Neustrelitz (Mecklenburg)
Putbus (Western Pomerania)
Ratzeburg (Holstein)
Schwerin (Mecklenburg)
Stade (Lower Saxony)
Waren (Mecklenburg)
Wolfenbüttel (Lower Saxony)
Eastern Germany:
Bautzen (Lusatia)
Erfurt (Thuringia)
Görlitz (Silesia)
Meissen (Saxony)
Pirna (Saxony)
Stolberg (Saxony-Anhalt)
Weimar (Thuringia)
Wernigerode (Saxony-Anhalt)
Southern Germany:
Baden-Baden (Baden)
Dinkelsbühl (Bavaria)
Freiburg (Baden)
Füssen (Bavaria)
Heidelberg (Baden)
Konstanz (Swabia)
Landshut (Bavaria)
Lindau (Bavaria)
Nuremberg (Franconia)
Ravensburg (Swabia)
Rothenburg (Bavaria)
Schwäbisch Hall (Swabia)
Tübingen (Swabia)
Würzburg (Franconia)
Western Germany:
Bacharach (Rhineland-Palatinate)
Beilstein (Rhineland)
Bernkastel-Kues (Rhineland)
Cochem (Rhineland-Palatinate)
Hattingen (North Rhine-Westphalia)
Landau (Palatinate)
Lemgo (Westphalia)
Limburg (Hesse)
Linz am Rhein (Rheinland)
Marburg (Hesse)
Monschau (Rhineland)
Montabaur (Rhineland-Palatinate)
Rüdesheim (Hesse)
Soest (North Rhine-Westphalia)
Trier (Rhineland-Palatinate)
Wetzlar(Hesse)
Xanten (Rhineland)

Greece 
 Old Town in Rhodes, UNESCO World Heritage Site
 Old Town of Corfu (city), UNESCO World Heritage Site
 Old Town of Hania
Nafplio
 Plaka, Athina

Italy 

UNESCO World Heritage old towns in Italy:
Assisi (Umbria)
Ferrara (Emilia-Romagna)
Florence (Tuscany)
Genoa (Liguria)
Mantua (Lombardy)
Modena (Emilia-Romagna)
Naples (Campania)
Pienza (Tuscany)
Pisa (Tuscany)
Ravenna (Emilia-Romagna)
Rome (Lazio)
San Gimignano (Tuscany)
Siena (Tuscany)
Siracusa (Sicily)
Urbino (Marche)
Venice (Veneto)
Verona (Veneto)
Vicenza (Veneto)

I Borghi più belli d'Italia is an association of small Italian towns of historical interest.

Other notable old towns include:
Northern Italy
Bassano del Grappa (Veneto)
Bergamo (Lombardy)
Bologna (Emilia-Romagna)
Bolzano (Trentino-Alto Adige)
Castelfranco Veneto (Veneto)
Chioggia (Veneto)
Cittadella (Veneto)
Milan (Lombardy)
Palmanova (Friuli-Venezia Giulia)
Parma (Emilia-Romagna)
Pavia (Lombardy)
Polcenigo (Friuli-Venezia Giulia)
Sacile (Friuli-Venezia Giulia)
Trento (Trentino-Alto Adige)
Treviso (Veneto)
Trieste (Friuli-Venezia Giulia)
Turin (Piedmont)
Udine (Friuli-Venezia Giulia)
Vittorio Veneto (Veneto)
Central Italy
Ancona (Marche)
Arezzo (Tuscany)
Camerino (Marche)
Colle di Val d'Elsa (Tuscany)
Gubbio (Umbria)
Loreto (Marche)
Lucca (Tuscany)
Massa Marittima (Tuscany)
Montalcino (Tuscany)
Montefiascone (Lazio)
Monteleone di Spoleto (Umbria)
Montepulciano (Tuscany)
Orvieto (Umbria)
Perugia (Umbria)
Tivoli (Lazio)
Viterbo (Lazio)
Volterra(Tuscany)
Southern Italy
Bari (Apulia)
Catania (Sicily)
Ostuni (Apulia)
Trani (Apulia) 
Martina Franca (Apulia) 
Monopoli (Apulia)
Lecce (Apulia)
Palermo (Sicily)
Cefalù (Sicily) 
Salerno (Campania) 
Maratea (Basilicata) 
Tropea (Calabria)
Benevento (Campania) 
Gallipoli (Apulia) 
Erice (Sicily)

Latvia 
 Vecrīga in Riga, UNESCO World Heritage Site

Lithuania 
 Senamiestis in Vilnius (a part of UNESCO)
 Senamiestis in Kaunas
 Senamiestis in Klaipėda
 Senamiestis in Trakai

Montenegro 
 Old Town of Kotor, a World Heritage Site
 Old Town of Budva
 Old Town of Herceg Novi
 Stara Varoš (Podgorica)
 Stari Bar

Netherlands 

The standard term for 'Old Town' in the Netherlands is "binnenstad", which translates as "innercity", i.e. in city on the inside of the city walls.

 Oude Stad in Nijmegen
 Oude Stad (Tilburg)

Norway 
 Old Town, Oslo

Poland 

 Kraków Old Town, a UNESCO World Heritage Site
 Warsaw Old Town, a UNESCO World Heritage Site
 Old City of Zamość, UNESCO World Heritage Site
 Medieval Town of Toruń, UNESCO World Heritage Site
 Poznań Old Town
 Old town of Chełmno
 Old town of Sandomierz
 Old town in Gdańsk
 Old town in Lublin
 Old town in Przemyśl
 Old town of Szczecin
 Old town of Stargard Szczeciński
 Old town of Trzebiatów
 Old town of Wrocław
 Police Old Town
 Old town of Nowe Warpno

Portugal 
Old town in Póvoa de Varzim, named "old town" (Vila Velha) since 1343.
Old town in Oporto
Old town in Guimarães
Óbidos, Portugal walled city
Old town in Évora
Old town in Lisboa

Romania 
 Old town of Arad
 Old town of Botoșani
 Old town of Brașov
 Old town of Brăila
 Old town of Bucharest
 Old town of Cluj Napoca
 Old town of Constanța
 Old town of Craiova
 Old town of Oradea
 Old town of Sibiu, a UNESCO World Heritage Site
 Old town of Sighișoara, a UNESCO World Heritage Site
 Old town of Timișoara

Serbia 
 Stari Grad, a neighborhood in Novi Sad
 Petrovaradin suburb
 Stari Grad, Sremski Karlovci - Cultural Heritage of Extraordinary importance
 Stari Grad, Kikinda - Cultural Heritage of Extraordinary importance
 Stari Grad, Zrenjanin - Cultural Heritage of Extraordinary importance
 Stari Grad, Bečej - Cultural Heritage of Extraordinary importance
 Stari Grad, Sombor - Cultural Heritage of Extraordinary importance
 Stari Grad, Pančevo - Cultural Heritage of Extraordinary importance
 Stari Grad, Subotica - Cultural Heritage of Extraordinary importance
 Stari Grad, Sremska Mitrovica - Cultural Heritage of Extraordinary importance
 Stari Grad, Zemun - Cultural Heritage of Extraordinary importance
 Stari Grad, a municipality in Belgrade
 Stara čaršija, Grocka, Belgrade - Two quarters of Old City are a Cultural Heritage of Extraordinary importance
 Tešnjar, Valjevo - Cultural Heritage of Extraordinary importance
 Stara čaršija, Novi Pazar - Cultural Heritage of Extraordinary importance
 Stari Grad, a municipality in Kragujevac
 Stari Grad, the remains of a fort in Užice
 Stari Grad, Ivanjica - Cultural Heritage of Extraordinary importance
 Stari Grad, Negotin - Cultural Heritage of Extraordinary importance

Slovakia 
 Staré Mesto in Bratislava
 Staré Mesto in Košice

Spain 
 UNESCO World Heritage old towns in Spain:
 Alcalá de Henares (Madrid)
 Ávila (Castile and León)
 Baeza (Andalusia)
 Cáceres (Extremadura)
 Córdoba (Andalusia)
 Cuenca (Castile-La Mancha)
 Salamanca (Castile and León)
 San Cristóbal de La Laguna (Canary Islands)
 Santiago de Compostela (Galicia)
 Segovia (Castile and León)
 Toledo (Castile-La Mancha)
 Úbeda (Andalusia)

Other notable/famous old towns include:
 Almagro (Castile-La Mancha)
 Andújar (Andalusia)
 Avilés (Asturias)
 Bilbao (Basque Country)
 Burgos (Castile and León)
 Cádiz (Andalusia)
 Girona (Catalonia)
 Granada (Andalusia)
 Hondarribia (Basque Country)
 Ibiza (Balearic Islands)
 Las Palmas de Gran Canaria (Canary Islands)
 León (Castile and León)
 Lorca (Murcia)
 Lugo (Galicia)
 Madrid (Madrid)
 Ourense (Galicia)
 Oviedo (Asturias)
 Palma de Mallorca (Balearic Islands)
 Pamplona (Navarre)
 Peniscola (Valencian Community)
 Pontevedra (Galicia)
 Priego de Córdoba (Andalusia)
 San Sebastián (Basque Country)
 San Roque (Andalusia)
 Sanlúcar de Barrameda (Andalusia)
 Seville (Andalusia)
 Solsona (Catalonia)
 Tafalla (Navarre)
 Tarragona (Catalonia)
 Teruel (Aragón)
 Toro (Castile and León)
 Trujillo (Extremadura)
 Tudela (Navarre)
 Vitoria-Gasteiz (Basque Country)
 Zamora (Castile and León)

Sweden 
 Gamla staden, Malmö
 Gamla stan, Stockholm
 Gamlestaden, Gothenburg
 Gammelstaden, Luleå Municipality
  Visby,  Region Gotland, UNESCO

Switzerland 
 Bern, UNESCO World Heritage Site
 Zürich, District 1

Turkey 
 Istanbul, Historic Peninsula (Fatih district)
 Ankara, Historic city center (Altındağ district)
 Amasya, Historic city center

Ukraine
 Stare Misto in Lviv
 Old Kyiv

United Kingdom

England
 UNESCO World Heritage old towns in England: 
 City of Bath
 Maritime Greenwich
 Liverpool Maritime Mercantile City
 Old Town, Barnsley
 Old Town, Chard
 Old Town, Croydon
 Old Town, Cumbria
 Old Town, Eastbourne
 Old Town, Hastings
 Old Town, Isles of Scilly
 Old Town, Kingston upon Hull
 Old Town, Northumberland
 Old Town, Southampton, a district of the city of Southampton
 Old Town, Swindon
 Old Town, West Yorkshire

Scotland
 Old Town, Edinburgh, a UNESCO World Heritage Site, along with the New Town, Edinburgh

Overseas territories
 Historic Town of St George, Bermuda, a UNESCO World Heritage Site

Middle East

Israel and Palestine 
 Old City of Jerusalem
 Old City of Acre
 Old City of Beersheba
 Old City of Haifa
 Old Jaffa
 Old City of Nazareth
 Old City of Bethlehem
 Old City of Ramle
 Old City of Hebron
 Old City of Nablus
 Old City of Tiberias
 Old City of Safed
 Old City of Lydda

Lebanon
 Old Byblos
 Old Sidon
 Old Tripoli
 Old Tyre
 Beirut Central District
 Old Batroun
 Deir el Qamar
 Rachaya

Saudi Arabia
 Diriyah in Riyadh

Syria
 Ancient City of Aleppo, in Syria
 Ancient City of Bosra, in Syria
 Ancient City of Damascus in Syria

Yemen
 Old City of Sana'a in Yemen
 Old Walled City of Shibam in Yemen
 Zabīd in Yemen

North America

Canada
Historic District of Old Quebec, Quebec, a UNESCO World Heritage Site
Old Town Lunenburg, Nova Scotia, a UNESCO World Heritage Site
Old Montreal, Quebec
Old Town, Toronto, Ontario

Cuba 
 Old Havana

Dominican Republic 
 Ciudad Colonial in Santo Domingo, oldest European city in America, UNESCO World Heritage Site

Mexico 
Historic center of Mexico City, Mexico City, a UNESCO World Heritage Site
Guanajuato City, Guanajuato, a UNESCO World Heritage Site
Morelia, Michoacán, a UNESCO World Heritage Site
Oaxaca City, Oaxaca, a UNESCO World Heritage Site
Zacatecas City, Zacatecas, a UNESCO World Heritage Site
Queretaro City, Querétaro
Campeche City, Campeche, a UNESCO World Heritage Site
Tlacotalpan, Veracruz, a UNESCO World Heritage Site
San Miguel de Allende, Guanajuato, a UNESCO World Heritage Site

Panama 
 Panamá Viejo, a UNESCO World Heritage Site

Puerto Rico 
 Old San Juan, UNESCO World Heritage Site, U.S. National Register of Historic Places

United States

California

Old Town Eureka, California an original 19th Century Victorian commercial district in Eureka, California
Old Town, Kern County, California
Old Town, Marin County, California
Old Town, Santa Barbara County, California
Old Town, Ventura County, California
Old Town, California, former name of Pine Town, California, in Lassen County
 Old Town Pasadena, California
 Old Sacramento State Historic Park, Sacramento, California
 Old Town San Diego State Historic Park, San Diego, California
 Old Town, San Diego, a neighborhood of San Diego

Florida
 Old Town, Florida, a town in Dixie County, not to be confused with the one in Orlando
 Old Town Fernandina, Fernandina Beach, Florida; the last town in the Western Hemisphere to be platted according to the Spanish "Law of the Indies" in 1811; named for King Ferdinand VII
 Old Town, Key West, the historic section of the city of Key West, Florida
 Old Town, an amusement park/shopping center in Kissimmee, Florida

North Carolina
 Old Town, Brunswick County, North Carolina
 Old Town, Forsyth County, North Carolina
 Old Town Township, Forsyth County, North Carolina

Tennessee
Old Town (Franklin, Tennessee) a location along the Natchez Trace named for the Mississippian mound complex there
Old Town (Mississippian culture mound complex), Franklin, Tennessee
Thomas Brown House (Franklin, Tennessee), also known as Old Town, NRHP-listed

Other US states
Old Town Scottsdale, Arizona
 Old Town, Augusta, Georgia
 Old Town, Chicago, Illinois
 Old Town, Indiana
 Old Town, Wichita, Kansas
 Old Town, Maine, a city
 Olde Towne Gaithersburg, Maryland
 Old Town Lansing, Michigan
 Old Town Albuquerque, New Mexico
 Old Town, Staten Island, New York
 Old Town Chinatown, Portland, Oregon
 Old Town Fairfax, Virginia
 Old Town Alexandria, Virginia
 Old Town Manassas, Virginia
 Olde Towne Portsmouth, Virginia

South America

Argentina 
 San Telmo and La Boca in Buenos Aires

Brazil

Northeast 

 Historic Center of Olinda
 Historic Center of Salvador, also known as Pelourinho
 Historic Center of São Luis

Center-West 
 Historic Center of Goiás, Goiás

Southeast 

 Historic Center of Diamantina, Minas Gerais
 Centro, in Rio de Janeiro
 Sé, in the Central Zone of São Paulo

South 
 Centro Histórico, in Porto Alegre

Colombia 
 La Candelaria, a historic neighborhood in downtown Bogotá

Ecuador 
 Quito´s Historic Center

Uruguay 
 Ciudad Vieja in Montevideo, "Old City" is the name of the oldest part of the city

Other uses 
 The Girls of Old Town, a group of prostitutes in the comic series Sin City
 Old Town (song), a song by Phil Lynott, later covered by the Corrs

See also 

 Altstadt
 Eskişehir, "Old City" in Turkish
 Old City (disambiguation)
 Oldtown (disambiguation)
 Stare Miasto (disambiguation), "Old Town" in Polish
 Stari Grad (disambiguation), means "Old Town"

References

External links

sr:Стари Град